Kenneth Duncan Jr. (born May 15, 1993), better known as BRS Kash, is an American rapper from Atlanta, Georgia. He is signed to Love Renaissance (LVRN) and Interscope Records.

Early life
Kash grew up in Atlanta listening to hip hop artists like Kilo Ali, Raheem the Dream, and Outkast.

Career
On November 22, 2019, BRS Kash released his first single "Throat Baby (Go Baby)". The single broke out in 2020 going viral on TikTok. In August 2020, it was announced he signed with Love Renaissance and Interscope Records. The single charted in the top 10 on the Billboard Hot R&B/Hip-Hop Songs Chart. On January 22, 2021, BRS Kash released his debut mixtape Kash Only, including the remix of "Throat Baby (Go Baby)" featuring DaBaby and City Girls.

Discography

Mixtapes

Singles

References

1993 births
Living people
21st-century African-American male singers
African-American songwriters
Songwriters from Georgia (U.S. state)
Interscope Records artists
Rappers from Chicago
Southern hip hop musicians
21st-century American rappers
21st-century American male musicians
American male songwriters